Emma Ulla Elisabet Hult (born 1988) is a Swedish politician and former member of the Riksdag, the national legislature. A member of the Green Party, she represented Jönköping County between September 2014 and September 2022.

Hult was educated in Trelleborg. She studied engineering at Jönköping University and architecture at Deakin University. She was a building permit administrator from 2011 to 2012 and a development engineer from 2012 to 2014.

References

1988 births
Living people
Members of the Riksdag 2014–2018
Members of the Riksdag 2018–2022
Members of the Riksdag from the Green Party
Women members of the Riksdag
21st-century Swedish women politicians
Deakin University alumni